Peter Garnett Marbaniang was an Indian parliamentarian, legislator and academician from the state of Meghalaya. He served as a Member of the Lok Sabha from 1989 to 1996, as Speaker of the Meghalaya Legislative Assembly and as a Minister in the Government of Meghalaya. He was the President of the All India Catholic Union from 1994 to 1996.

Political career 

He was a member of the Meghalaya Legislative Assembly between 1972 and 1983. He served as a minister in the State government from 1975 to 1983.
He was re-elected to the Meghalaya Legislative Assembly between 1988 and 1989, serving as Speaker of the Meghalaya Legislative Assembly. Peter Garnett Marbaniang represented the Shillong Lok Sabha Constituency of Meghalaya from 1989 to 1996 in the Lok Sabha.

Lok Sabha 
Peter Garnett Marbaniang represented the Shillong Lok Sabha Constituency of Meghalaya from 1989 to 1996 in the Lok Sabha
He was elected from the Shillong constituency in 1988 to the Ninth Lok Sabha with 148,657 votes, or 50.77% of the total, running on the Indian National Congress ticket.
He was re-elected in 1991 to the Tenth Lok Sabha with 144,895 votes, or 48.75% or the total.

In the Lok Sabha, he was a member of Committees on Public Accounts, Public Undertakings, Transport and Tourism, Business Advisory and General Purposes. He was nominated as a member of the panel of Chairmen of the Lok Sabha in 1992.

Meghalaya Legislative Assembly 
Peter Garnett Marbaniang was a member of the Meghalaya Legislative Assembly between 1972 and 1983 and was re-elected to the Assembly between 1988 and 1989, serving as Speaker of the Meghalaya Legislative Assembly. During his tenure as a member of the House, he served as Chairman of the Estimates Committee of the Assembly.

He was part of the Indian Parliamentary Delegation to the 34th Commonwealth Parliamentary Conference in Canberra which was held between 14 to 25 September 1988. The Indian Delegation was led by Pratibha Devisingh Patil, the then Deputy-Chairman of the Rajya Sabha and also consisted of Dr. Najma Heptullah. The Conference discussed subjects including "International peace and security; AIDS: The nature of the disease, its spread, containment efforts, the role of Parliamentarians in helping contain the threat and Public Education Programme; Environmental protection in relation to population growth, industrialization and urbanization; and The Commonwealth response to super power disarmament issues".

District Council 
He was the Chairman of the Khasi Hills Autonomous District Council from 1975 to 1983. The Autonomous District Council is one of the three autonomous district councils within Meghalaya, and one of twenty-five autonomous regions of India. The Sixth Schedule of the Constitution of India allows for the formation of autonomous administrative divisions which have been given autonomy within their respective states.

Christian leader

Marbaniang was a member of the All India Catholic Union (AICU). He was a vice-president during the tenure of Chhotebhai Noronha as president of the union (1990-1994), and in 1990 accompanied  Chhotebhai in a meeting of minority leaders with prime minister Vishwanath Pratap Singh.
Marbaniang served as President of the AICU from 1994 to 1996, being succeeded by Norbert D'Souza.
In May 1995 Marbaniang promised to take up the question of introducing a Christian Marriage Bill in parliament. The purpose was to eliminate injustices in laws related to divorce and adoption by Christians.

In March 1996 the government failed to pass a bill that would extend special statutory benefits to Christians of Dalit origin. Marbaniang had met the prime minister at least ten times and asked repeatedly for the introduction of the Dalit bill. It was withdrawn on a procedural technicality.
Marbaniang said the Congress party would have to pay "a heavy price for ignoring the four-decade-old Christian demand" in upcoming general elections.
Marbaniang left the party, giving the "dictatorial attitude" of its leadership as his reason.

Education 

Peter G Marbaniang was educated at Guwahati University where he received his M.A and LL.B.

Interests 
Peter was the President, Meghalaya Table Tennis Association and Meghalaya Volleyball Association.

Legacy

Peter G. Marbaniang died in Shillong on 29 September 1997 at the age of 58 years.
He was a member of the Meghalaya Legislative Assembly and Minister of Social Welfare in the State Government at the time of his death.
His wife, Q.E. Lyngdoh, died on 20 January 2010 at the age of 71, leaving behind nine children and 19 grandchildren.
His son, Robert G. Lyngdoh, was twice elected to the Meghalaya Legislative Assembly who served as Home Minister in the State Government .
His daughter, Ampareen Lyngdoh, is a member of the Meghalaya Legislative Assembly who was a Cabinet Minister in the Government of Meghalaya.

References

1939 births
1997 deaths
Meghalaya politicians
India MPs 1989–1991
India MPs 1991–1996
Lok Sabha members from Meghalaya
India MPs 1998–1999
India MPs 1999–2004
India MPs 2004–2009
State cabinet ministers of Meghalaya
Meghalaya MLAs 1972–1978
Meghalaya MLAs 1978–1983
Meghalaya MLAs 1988–1993